Orange Music Electronic Company is an English amplifier manufacturing company, noted for their products' distinctive sound and the bright orange Tolex-like covering of their heads and speaker cabinets.  The company was founded in 1968 by Cliff Cooper, who decided to build his own amplifiers when vendors refused to supply his West End musical instrument store, Orange Store, due to Cooper's youth and countercultural image.  The brand's early amps were adopted by Peter Green of Fleetwood Mac and were used on Stevie Wonder's Superstition, which brought Orange worldwide recognition.  The brand's "Pics Only" models—nicknamed for their use of symbols rather than text on their control panels—were released in the early 1970s to much success and established a signature "Orange sound."  However, large-scale production of Orange Amps ceased in 1978 and Cooper spent the '80s building and selling amps in limited numbers.  After a line of reissue models licensed by Gibson in the early '90s proved unsuccessful, Cooper regained control of the brand and found new success with the 1998 release of the AD30, with notable fans like Jimmy Page.  In 2003, Orange released the Rockerverb series, which has become a favorite amp among heavy metal guitarists.

History

1960s

Orange was founded in 1968 by musician and electronics designer Clifford Cooper of London, and opened premises at 3 New Compton Street in London's West End. Initially, Cooper used only the basement as a professional recording studio. The original studio featured an IBC mixing console originally owned by Joe Meek, producer of The Millionaires. Because the studio failed to meet its business costs, on September 2, 1968 the ground floor premises were opened as a music shop. In order to cover wage costs for the business, Cooper sold his own electronic musical equipment.

Difficulties in obtaining stock meant that the new Orange shop at first dealt only in second hand equipment. Many musicians around that time preferred older, used, or beaten-up guitars as they were considered to be of better quality and have more character than the new ones available. The Orange shop was the first to cater for this market. The difficulties faced in stocking the shop led Cooper to design Orange's own amplifiers. In late autumn of 1968, Huddersfield based company Radio Craft, owned by Mat Mathias, was appointed to produce the first Orange-branded amplifiers.

Whilst in London, Orange shop salesman Mick Dines became closely involved with the design of Orange cabinets. Because Dines was a touring musician, he understood how road travel strained equipment and lead to breakdown. Dines ensured that durability was at the forefront of the Orange design, with features such as the basketweave grillecloth. Additionally, wooden skids provided strength and improved the sound dramatically by acoustically coupling the cabinet to the stage or wooden floor.

It is a common misconception that the earliest Orange amplifiers were jointly produced by Orange and Matamp, the brand name that Mathias used on his own design of amplifiers. This was not the case. Radio Craft produced hi-fi guitar amplifiers which, whilst ideal for bass guitar, produced a tone far too clean and flat for electric lead guitars. Early Orange Matamp amplifiers were built by Radio Craft to Cooper's specification to provide a new generation of guitarists with the sustain they demanded. The front end was modified and Cooper changed the chassis from lightweight aluminium to enamelled steel. The Orange logo was designed to be clearly visible on stage. When the design was delivered to Radio Craft, Mathias suggested that a small Matamp logo be added. As a courtesy to Mathias, Cooper agreed to this request, making Matamp a model name.

The first of the Orange Matamp amplifiers were 100 watt valve amps and were produced in very small numbers in the rear of a tobacconist shop owned by Mathias. Demand for Orange amplifiers grew quickly and Radio Craft was unable to keep up with orders. It became apparent that larger premises were required for business growth.

Mathias was unable to finance the move at the time. In 1969, Cooper Mathias Ltd was formed to replace Radio Craft. Cooper's feeling was that a 50/50 partnership would be to the advantage of all parties, rather than to simply finance Radio Craft with the benefit of cheaper overheads in Huddersfield than in London. The central plan behind Cooper Mathias was to increase capacity and productivity to a level at which the service could be offered to other amplifier companies.

1970s
The factory in Cowcliffe near Huddersfield was opened in early 1970. Mathias would drive from Huddersfield with a small number of completed amplifier chassis which would be fitted into sleeves, boxed, and despatched from the Orange Shop in London. At this time business in London was moving very rapidly; however, the situation in Huddersfield was much slower. Whilst visiting the factory for a production meeting, Cooper was struck by the slow pace of production. Large numbers of back orders meant that production at Cowcliffe was failing to keep up with demand and the low number of units being produced caused the operation to be non cost effective and not covering its overheads.

The decision was taken to end Orange's relationship with Matamp. Cooper and Mathias remained on friendly terms despite the split, with Cooper describing Mathias as "a real gentleman for whom I have always had nothing but the greatest admiration." After the decision to cease production in Huddersfield, Cooper located premises in a derelict shop on the corner of Neil's Yard and Short's Gardens in the Covent Garden area of London. This move was to increase productivity and to provide more room for cabinet making, amp testing, and storage, with cabinets being produced on the ground floor and amplifiers in the basement.
 
In 1971, whilst driving in London, Cooper noticed the new road signs being introduced into the UK used graphic symbols rather than words and asked the design team to come up with a set of custom symbols that would clearly show what the control was for and would make sense to users who may not be familiar with English.

It was in 1972 that John James, Orange's Research and Development Engineer, designed what would become one of the world's most iconic amplifiers, The "Graphic Valve Amplifier," nicknamed simply "Pics Only", which was a reference to the unique front graphic panels. Early models of the Pics Only were known as "Plexis" because they had a plastic reverse printed perspex panel secured on an orange steel backplate fixed to the chassis. With later models the front panel was not plastic but silk screen printed metal plates. The Pics Only was the start of the new sound now associated with Orange and has remained the influence for the design and sound of Orange Amplifiers. With demand for Orange amplifiers still increasing it was necessary once again to seek larger premises and locate a proper factory facility.

In 1973, production was moved to 17 Upland Road, Bexleyheath, in Kent. There a proper production line was possible, and this resulted in a marked increase in the number of amplifiers and cabinets being completed, an average of one amp per worker per day. This more industrial approach meant that amplifiers and cabinets could be lined up, 20–30 units at a time, and completed sequentially. This period saw distribution of Orange products in the US for the first time. It was also in 1973 that the Pics Only was redesigned. As well as some electronic modifications, the front panel was amended resulting in the Graphic 120 "Pics & Text" amplifier which was launched in 1974.

In 1975, Orange launched the Custom Reverb Twin MKII which was introduced to compete directly with the Fender Twin Reverb; similarly priced, this amp featured a Hammond spring reverb, a tremolo, and a master volume. It was initially available only as a 50 Watt but the success of this model as a versatile studio amplifier led to a 100 Watt version being produced. Unusually, this model featured black with silver fleck speaker cloth rather than the iconic Basketweave grille cloth.

The Orange brand was well established as a manufacturer of valve amps by the mid-1970s, but Cooper was keen to diversify the Orange product range and include solid state amplifiers for the first time. OMEC, which stands for Orange Music Electronic Company, was formed. Cooper engaged designer Peter Hamilton with the brief to design a computerised amp. The only way to achieve this was with the use of SSI and MSI (small and medium scale logic chips.)

At the time there was a stark choice, largely due to cost, between TTL (transistor-transistor logic) which consumed a large amount of power but was readily available and well proven or a new technology from RCA called COS-MOS which was low power consumption but prone to static damage. At the time COS-MOS was considered too risky to use. That technology led to today's CMOS microcontrollers with built in static protection, low power consumption, and millions of transistors on a single chip. Hamilton's design was known as the OMEC Digital Programmable Amplifier and was the world's first digitally programmable amplifier. Real DSP was not readily available until the mid-1990s so the OMEC Digital was effectively a digitally controlled analogue amplifier. A drawback to using TTL became apparent quite quickly as the programmable memory took almost an amp at 5 watts, so any settings were lost as soon as the amplifier was turned off. A backup battery was added in the event of a brief power cut but these would only last approximately one hour. Ultimately, the OMEC Digital Amplifier proved to be innovative but ahead of its time and would require a huge amount of investment to make it financially viable.

Whilst the programmable computerised amplifier was perhaps released a decade too soon, Orange continued to produce solid state amplifiers, with the denim clad Jimmy Bean amp being released in 1976. The low cost but high quality integrated circuit chips used in the OMEC allowed for a wealth of innovative signal processing technology to be adapted to other amplifiers and, when coupled with a proven power amp design, led to the launch of a series of solid state amps and matching cabinets throughout 1976 to 1979.

By the late 1970s the music world had moved on significantly from the psychedelic hippie movement of the 1960s and the decision was taken to update the design of the range. The typeface was changed to a more modern font, the sleeve was lowered to give a sleeker look, and the basketweave grille was changed to a black material with a different level of sound transparency. As part of this major makeover in 1978/1978 Orange divided its product range into Orange Sound Reinforcement and Orange Instrument Amplification. Sound reinforcement included PA, mixing desks, and solid state power amps. Examples of models from this period include the Series Two and the Hustler range of guitar and bass amplifiers.

In 1978 the Orange Shop closed when the buildings on New Compton Street were demolished. Production ceased at the Bexleyheath factory in 1979 when two major overseas distributors going into liquidation within a short period of time made the production line no longer viable.

1980s

Throughout the 1980s production of Orange Amplifiers was extremely limited with Cooper continuing to build and sell in small quantities to special order.

1990s

The Orange Gibson Years 1993–1997
Following Mathias' death in 1989, his sons Peter and Richard continued the business until 1992 when the company was sold to amplifier enthusiast Jeff Lewis. In 1993, Gibson licensed the name to manufacture Orange Amplification. Gibson decided to have their Orange amplifiers made by Matamp in Huddersfield again in order to keep the "Made in England" identity. The first Gibson era Orange reissues released were the Graphic 120 and Overdrive 120 launching in 1994 followed by the Graphic 80 and Overdrive 80.

Sonically, there was a marked difference between these reissues and the original 1970s Pics & text heads. The capacitors fitted in the EQ section had Series Two Overdrive Head values. A small number of Orange Super Bass 120 reissues were also made based on the circuit of the 1979 Series Two Super Bass. The 1990s Orange reissues were not commercially successful and it was mutually agreed that the licence would not be renewed. In February 1997, Gibson handed the Orange name back to Cliff Cooper.

1997–1999

Renewed success
With the brand back under Cooper's control, guitarist and valve amplifier expert, Adrian Emsley was brought in as technical director with the brief to update and refresh the product range. Guitarist Noel Gallagher had used Orange almost exclusively on the early Oasis albums and as in the early days of Orange, Cooper was keen to get opinions from leading guitarists so Cooper and Emsley approached Gallagher to talk through any requirements that would improve his sound.

Gallagher was using an Orange Overdrive which he required more crunch from. As a result, changes were made to the Overdrive circuit, including modifications to the phase inverter and preamp. A standby switch replaced the output socket on the rear. The modifications suggested by Gallagher formed the basis of the OTR amplifier (Oscillatory Transition Return).

In 1998, the AD Series was launched. Initially consisting of the AD30 head without reverb, the AD30R, a 2×12 combo with reverb, and the AD15 combo, which was available with 10" or 12" speakers. The range received critical and commercial acclaim and attracted major artists such as former Led Zeppelin guitarist Jimmy Page and ex-Fleetwood Mac guitarist Jeremy Spencer. In 1999, The AD15 won the Editor's Pick Award from the US Guitar Player magazine – Orange being the first British company in that category to do so. The award saw global interest not only in the AD15 but in Orange as a brand and was a major factor in re-establishing the company.

2000s
The millennium era has seen unprecedented diversification of the Orange product range, from clothing to personal computers. Some notable events during this period include:
 2001 Orange opens USA offices in Atlanta, Georgia.
 2006 The Tiny Terror is launched.
 2008 40th anniversary year – Orange produce 40 hand made Custom Shop amps each with a girl's name.
 2009 Orange move into new headquarters in Borehamwood, Hertfordshire.
 2010 Cliff Cooper's son Charlie designs and launches the OPC (Orange Personal Computer) aimed at the musician/home studio market. Orange open a custom designed factory in China.
 2018 50th anniversary of the founding of the company.

Legacy Companies

Orange Studios
Before Orange Amps, there was Orange Studios. Cliff Cooper built the studio with his friend Brian Hatt over the course of the summer, hand-cutting, stripping, and soldering every wire. "Our basement studio had a great vibe," Cooper recounts, "It was very large and, as nobody lived or worked on either side, volume wasn't an issue. Most bands preferred to come in for night sessions."

Orange Hire

Orange Hire was created to provide the PA and backline for larger venues and outdoor summer festivals such as Reading and the Isle of Wight. A fleet of Mercedes 405D vans were converted into state-of-the-art hire vehicles all were radio equipped and had full amp repair facilities fitted. In 1972, Orange Hire was awarded the contract to provide PA equipment for music at the Olympic Games in Munich.

Orange Management

Orange Management was formed in 1969 signing up artists such as John Miles, Smokie, Nigel Benjamin (ex Mott The Hoople) and his band English Assassin, Cock Sparrer and The Realistics amongst others. Not limited to musical artists, in 1971 motorcycle stunt rider and model Eddie Kidd was signed to Orange Management.

Orange Records

It became apparent that while the studios were being used to record demos, many artists were finding it difficult to secure a record deal with a major label. A pressing and distribution deal was signed with Pye Records for the UK and soon afterwards licensing deals for overseas territories. The "Voice of the World" logo of an Orange tree sitting upon a globe was used for the label with a full colour sleeve; however, with the flower power movement waning, it was decided in the early 1970s to change the look to a black background with gold lettering.

Orange Publishing

Orange publishing was formed in 1969. Former Head of Copyright at EMI, Dennis Sinnott was appointed by Cliff Cooper to establish Orange Publishing and over the next five years signed a variety of bands including Cock Sparrer, The Little Roosters, The Tremeloes and Kenny Ball. Many of whom had records out on the Orange label. Orange Publishing, (now known as Orange Songs.) has a large catalogue with numerous copyrights, including the Grand Rights to several musicals and film scores.

Orange Agency

Orange Agency was also formed in 1969 as a means to tie together all Orange music related activities. Working from premises at 4 New Compton Street bands and artists were booked into venues around the UK. Joe Cocker was booked into The Pheasantry Club in London's Kings Road in Chelsea, which resulted in Orange Agency becoming the sole booking agents for the venue. Bookings for The Marquee and other famous London venues followed the business grew rapidly and began booking tours, flying in acts from America to tour throughout Europe.

See also
 Vintage musical equipment

References

External links 
 
 Interview with Adrian Emsley of Orange Amplification on The Bone Reader
 Orange Stereo Micro Crush product review
 Clifford Cooper Interview NAMM Oral History Library (2003)

Audio amplifier manufacturers
Electronics companies established in 1968
Audio equipment manufacturers of the United Kingdom
Guitar amplifier manufacturers
1968 establishments in England